Rubus alpinus is a New World species of brambles in the rose family. It grows in Jamaica, Costa Rica, Guatemala, Colombia, Honduras, Panamá, Venezuela, and the 3 Guianas.

Rubus alpinus is a perennial with purple stems with curved prickles. Leaves are compound with 3 or 5 leaflets. Flowers are white. Fruits are hairless, the drupelets falling off separately.

References

alpinus
Flora of South America
Flora of Central America
Flora of Jamaica
Plants described in 1850
Flora without expected TNC conservation status